William "Red" Holzman (August 10, 1920 – November 13, 1998) was an American professional basketball player and coach. He is best known as the head coach of the New York Knicks of the National Basketball Association (NBA) from 1967 to 1977, and again from 1978 to 1982. Holzman helped lead the Knicks to two NBA championships in 1970 and 1973, and was inducted into the Basketball Hall of Fame in 1986.

In 1996, Holzman was named one of the Top 10 Coaches in NBA History.

Early career
Holzman was born in the Lower East Side of Manhattan in New York City, on August 10, 1920, to Jewish immigrant parents, as the son of a Romanian mother and Russian father. He grew up in Brooklyn's Ocean Hill–Brownsville neighborhood and played basketball for Franklin K. Lane High School  in the mid-1930s. He attended the University of Baltimore and later the City College of New York, where he played for two years until graduation in 1942. Holzman joined the United States Navy in the same year, and played on the Norfolk, Virginia Naval Base team till he was discharged from the Navy in 1945.

Professional career

After the Navy, Holzman joined the NBL Rochester Royals, which won the NBL championship in Holzman's first season, and he was named Rookie of the Year in 1944–45. In 1945–46 and 1947–48 he was on the NBL's first All League team; in the interim year he was on its second team. Holzman stayed with the team through their move to the NBA and subsequent NBA championship in 1951. In 1953, Holzman left the Royals and joined the Milwaukee Hawks as a player-coach, eventually retiring as a player in 1954 but continuing as the team's head coach.

Coaching career
During the 1956–1957 season, Holzman led the Hawks (then in St. Louis, Missouri) to 19 losses during their first 33 games, and was subsequently fired. He then became a scout for the New York Knicks for the next ten years, till 1967, whereupon he became the team's head coach for the most part until 1982. Holzman's former player, Willis Reed, replaced him as Knicks head coach in 1977, but Holzman returned near the start of the 1978–1979 season. During this 15-year span as Knicks' coach, Holzman won a total of 613 games, including two NBA championships in 1970 and 1973.

In 1969, Holzman coached the Knicks to a then single-season NBA record 18-game win streak, breaking the 17-game record first set back in 1946. For his efforts leading up to the Knicks' 1970 championship win, Holzman was named the NBA Coach of the Year for that year. He won his second NBA championship as the Knicks won the 1973 NBA Finals against the Lakers. He was one of very few individuals to have won an NBA championship as both player and coach. As a coach, his final record was 696 wins and 604 losses. At the time of his retirement in 1982, he had the second most career victories as a head coach in NBA history.

In 1985, Holzman was elected into the Naismith Memorial Basketball Hall of Fame. The New York Knicks have retired the number 613 in his honor, equaling the number of wins he accumulated as their head coach. He is also a member of the International Jewish Sports Hall of Fame.

Holzman lived with his wife in a home they bought in Cedarhurst, New York in the 1950s. Following his lengthy NBA coaching career, Holzman was diagnosed with leukemia and died at Long Island Jewish Medical Center in New Hyde Park, New York in 1998. In 2000 a clock tower was erected in his honor at the intersection of Central Avenue and Cedarhurst Avenue in Cedarhurst as part of “Operation Downtown,” a project started by Nassau County presiding officer Bruce Blakeman and mayor Andy Parise.

Career statistics

BAA/NBA

Regular season

Playoffs

Source: Basketball Reference

College

Source: Basketball-Reference.com

Head coaching record

|-
| style="text-align:left;"|Milwaukee Hawks
| style="text-align:left;"|
|26||10||16||.385|| style="text-align:center;"|4th Western||—||—||—||—
| style="text-align:center;"|Missed playoffs
|-
| style="text-align:left;"|Milwaukee Hawks
| style="text-align:left;"|
|72||26||46||.361|| style="text-align:center;"|4th Western||—||—||—||—
| style="text-align:center;"|Missed playoffs
|-
| style="text-align:left;"|St. Louis Hawks
| style="text-align:left;"|
|72||33||39||.458|| style="text-align:center;"|3rd Western||8||4||4||.500
| style="text-align:center;"|Lost in Western Division Finals
|-
| style="text-align:left;"|St. Louis Hawks
| style="text-align:left;"|
|33||14||19||.424|| style="text-align:center;"|—||—||—||—||—
| style="text-align:center;"|—
|-
| style="text-align:left;"|New York Knicks
| style="text-align:left;"|
|45||28||17||.622|| style="text-align:center;"|3rd in Eastern||6||2||4||.333
| style="text-align:center;"|Lost in Eastern Division Semifinals
|-
| style="text-align:left;"|New York Knicks
| style="text-align:left;"|
|82||54||28||.659|| style="text-align:center;"|3rd in Eastern||10||6||4||.600
| style="text-align:center;"|Lost in Eastern Division Finals
|- ! style="background:#FDE910;"
| style="text-align:left;"|New York Knicks
| style="text-align:left;"|
|82||60||22||.732|| style="text-align:center;"|1st in Eastern||19||12||7||.632
| style="text-align:center;"|Won NBA Championship
|-
| style="text-align:left;"|New York Knicks
| style="text-align:left;"|
|82||52||30||.634|| style="text-align:center;"|1st in Eastern||12||7||5||.583
| style="text-align:center;"|Lost in Conference Semifinals
|-
| style="text-align:left;"|New York Knicks
| style="text-align:left;"|
|82||48||34||.585|| style="text-align:center;"|2nd in Eastern||16||9||7||.563
| style="text-align:center;"|Lost in NBA Finals
|- ! style="background:#FDE910;"
| style="text-align:left;"|New York Knicks
| style="text-align:left;"|
|82||57||25||.695|| style="text-align:center;"|2nd in Eastern||17||12||5||.706
| style="text-align:center;"|Won NBA Championship
|-
| style="text-align:left;"|New York Knicks
| style="text-align:left;"|
|82||49||33||.598|| style="text-align:center;"|2nd in Eastern||12||5||7||.417
| style="text-align:center;"|Lost in Conference Finals
|-
| style="text-align:left;"|New York Knicks
| style="text-align:left;"|
|82||40||42||.488|| style="text-align:center;"|3rd in Eastern||3||1||2||.333
| style="text-align:center;"|Lost in First Round
|-
| style="text-align:left;"|New York Knicks
| style="text-align:left;"|
|82||38||44||.463|| style="text-align:center;"|4th in Eastern||—||—||—||—
| style="text-align:center;"|Missed playoffs
|-
| style="text-align:left;"|New York Knicks
| style="text-align:left;"|
|82||40||42||.488|| style="text-align:center;"|3rd in Eastern||—||—||—||—
| style="text-align:center;"|Missed playoffs
|-
| style="text-align:left;"|New York Knicks
| style="text-align:left;"|
|68||25||43||.368|| style="text-align:center;"|4th in Eastern||—||—||—||—
| style="text-align:center;"|Missed playoffs
|-
| style="text-align:left;"|New York Knicks
| style="text-align:left;"|
|82||39||43||.476|| style="text-align:center;"|4th in Eastern||—||—||—||—
| style="text-align:center;"|Missed playoffs
|-
| style="text-align:left;"|New York Knicks
| style="text-align:left;"|
|82||50||32||.610|| style="text-align:center;"|3rd in Eastern||2||0||2||.000
| style="text-align:center;"|Lost in First Round
|-
| style="text-align:left;"|New York Knicks
| style="text-align:left;"|
|82||33||49||.402|| style="text-align:center;"|5th in Eastern||—||—||—||—
| style="text-align:center;"|Missed playoffs
|- class="sortbottom"
| style="text-align:left;"|Career
| ||1300||696||604||.535|| ||105||58||47||.552

Source: Basketball Reference

Publications

See also
List of select Jewish basketball players

References

Further reading

External links

 
 Biography of Red Holzman
 The NBA at 50: Red Holzman
 NBA statistics as player
 NBA statistics as coach
 

1920 births
1998 deaths
All-American college men's basketball players
American men's basketball players
American people of Romanian-Jewish descent
American people of Russian-Jewish descent
Baltimore Bees men's basketball players
Basketball coaches from New York (state)
Basketball players from New York City
BSN coaches
Deaths from cancer in New York (state)
CCNY Beavers men's basketball players
Deaths from leukemia
International Jewish Sports Hall of Fame inductees
Jewish American sportspeople
Jewish men's basketball players
Milwaukee Hawks players
Milwaukee Hawks head coaches
Naismith Memorial Basketball Hall of Fame inductees
National Basketball Association championship-winning head coaches
New York Knicks assistant coaches
New York Knicks head coaches
People from Cedarhurst, New York
Player-coaches
Rochester Royals players
Sportspeople from Brooklyn
Sportspeople from Nassau County, New York
St. Louis Hawks head coaches
Point guards
United States Navy personnel of World War II
20th-century American Jews